Enclosed CJK Letters and Months is a Unicode block containing circled and parenthesized Katakana, Hangul, and CJK ideographs. Also included in the block are miscellaneous glyphs that would more likely fit in CJK Compatibility or Enclosed Alphanumerics: a few unit abbreviations, circled numbers from 21 to 50, and circled multiples of 10 from 10 to 80 enclosed in black squares (representing speed limit signs).

Its block name in Unicode 1.0 was Enclosed CJK Letters and Ideographs. As part of the process of unification with ISO 10646 for version 1.1, Unicode version 1.0.1 relocated the Japanese Industrial Standard Symbol from the code point U+32FF at the end of the block to U+3004, and re-arranged the encircled katakana letters (U+32D0–U+32FE) from iroha order to gojūon order.

The Reiwa symbol (㋿) was added to Enclosed CJK Letters and Months in Unicode 12.1, continuing from the existing era symbols in the (fully allocated by that point) CJK Compatibility block (Meiji ㍾, Taishō ㍽, Shōwa ㍼, Heisei ㍻).

Block

Emoji
The Enclosed CJK Letters and Months block contains two emoji:
U+3297 and U+3299.

The block has four standardized variants defined to specify emoji-style (U+FE0F VS16) or text presentation (U+FE0E VS15) for the
two emoji, both of which default to a text presentation.

History
U+32FF JAPANESE INDUSTRIAL STANDARD SYMBOL (〄) was moved to U+3004 in Unicode version 1.0.1, to make Unicode a subset of ISO 10646.  U+32FF was defined as SQUARE ERA NAME REIWA (㋿) with the release of Unicode 12.1.

The following Unicode-related documents record the purpose and process of defining specific characters in the Enclosed CJK Letters and Months block:

See also 
 Hangul Jamo (Unicode block)
 Japanese rebus monogram
 Katakana (Unicode block)

References 

CJK Letters and Months